Ruben Bakke (born 13 March 1972) is a retired Norwegian football midfielder.

Hailing from Håpet in Tromsø, Bakke broke through in Tromsø IL's first team in 1991. After the 1992 season he took two seasons in Strømsgodset IF, losing the 1993 Norwegian Football Cup Final. He continued as a journeyman in IL Stålkameratene, Skjetten SK, Drøbak-Frogn IL and Manglerud Star.

After retiring he tried his hand in various professions, relocating to Fosnavåg.

References

1972 births
Living people
Sportspeople from Tromsø
Norwegian footballers
Tromsø IL players
Strømsgodset Toppfotball players
Skjetten SK players
Drøbak-Frogn IL players
Manglerud Star Toppfotball players
Norwegian First Division players
Eliteserien players
Association football midfielders